Rakuten Rewards, formerly known as Ebates, is a cash-back and shopping rewards company. Its revenue comes from affiliate network links. Members of the site click through affiliate links before shopping at a retailer's site. Once the member makes a purchase, Rakuten Rewards receives an affiliate commission from the retailer which is then shared with the member. The company publishes links both on its website and through a browser extension as well as a mobile app.

History
Rakuten Rewards was founded as Ebates in 1998 in Menlo Park, California, by two former deputy district attorneys, Alessandro Isolani and Paul Wasserman. Funded by the venture capital firm Foundation Capital, Ebates.com was launched on 3 May 1999, offering up to 25% cash back from about 40 online retailers.

In September 2014, Ebates was acquired by the Japanese e-commerce company Rakuten for US$1 billion. In 2019, the Ebates brand was phased out and replaced with Rakuten Rewards.

Acquisitions

Services/tools

Logos

References 

American companies established in 1998
Internet properties established in 1998
1998 establishments in California
Companies based in San Mateo, California
Rakuten
2014 mergers and acquisitions
American subsidiaries of foreign companies